Metasesarma is a genus of crabs in the family Sesarmidae.

Species 
WoRMS and GBIF list two species:

Metasesarma aubryi (A. Milne-Edwards, 1869)
Metasesarma obesum (Dana, 1851)

References 

Grapsoidea
Decapod genera
Taxa named by Henri Milne-Edwards